Violeta Hemsy de Gainza (born 25 January 1929) is an Argentine pianist and piano pedagogue.

Biography
Violeta Hemsy de Gainza was born in Tucumán Province on 25 January 1929. She completed her undergraduate studies at the National University of Tucumán, where she graduated with a licentiate in music, piano specialty. In 1951 she obtained a scholarship to improve her skills at the Teacher's College at Columbia University in New York. She later studied in Paris with Gerda Alexander, creator of the concept of "eutony" (1976), and in Denmark (1982). She has written about 40 publications that have been translated into English, French, German, Italian, Portuguese, and Dutch, ranging from general music pedagogy, piano, and guitar teaching, to children's and youth vocal ensembles, as well as improvisation and music therapy. These are frequently cited in theses and research papers.

She served as president of the Latin American Forum of Musical Education (FLADEM) from its founding in 1995 until 2005. She was a board member of the International Society for Music Education (ISME) from 1986 to 1990. She has also been invited as a juror, teacher, and lecturer by universities, conservatories, musical and artistic centers, as well as international organizations such as the Organization of American States, UNESCO, and governments such as France, Germany, Spain's Ministry of Education, and Colombia's Ministry of Culture.

In 1989, Hemsy received the Konex Award diploma of merit for classical music.

She also ventured into the publishing field as director of the Pedagogical Library Musical Collection for the Guadalupe Publishing House, editor of the ISME yearbooks in Spanish, editor of the magazine of the Argentine Association of Music Therapy, and co-director of the Lumen Publishing Group's Body, Art, and Health Collection.

Hemsy has served as ISME's honorary president and coordinator of its Music Therapy Commission (1974–1986), and has taught at the Carlos López Buchardo National Conservatory and the Manuel de Falla Municipal Conservatory in Buenos Aires.

Selected works
 Fundamentos, materiales y técnicas de la educación musical (1984), Editorial Ricordi Americana, .
 La iniciación musical del niño (1984), Editorial Ricordi Americana, .
 Método para piano (1984), Editorial Barry, .
 Música para niños compuesta por niños (1984), Editorial Guadalupe, .
 A jugar y cantar con el piano (1993), Editorial Guadalupe, .
 La educación musical frente al futuro (1993), Editorial Guadalupe, .
 La improvisación musical (1993), Editorial Ricordi Americana, .
 El cantar tiene sentido (1994), Editorial Ricordi Americana, .
 Aproximación a la eutonía, conversaciones con Gerda Alexander (1997), Editorial Paidós, .
 Claudio Gabis: sur, blues y educación musical (2000), Editorial Lumen, .
 En música in dependencia educación y crisis social (2007), Editorial Lumen, .
 Conversaciones con Gerda Alexander (2007), Editorial Lumen, .

References

External links
  
 Violeta Hemsy de Gainza at ISME

1929 births
20th-century Argentine educators
20th-century Argentine women writers
20th-century Argentine writers
21st-century Argentine educators
Argentine women educators
21st-century Argentine women writers
21st-century Argentine writers
Argentine classical pianists
Argentine non-fiction writers
Argentine publishers (people)
Argentine women pianists
Living people
National University of Tucumán alumni
People from Tucumán Province
Piano pedagogues
Teachers College, Columbia University alumni
Women music educators
Women classical pianists
20th-century women educators
21st-century women educators